Alfredo Di Stéfano (1926–2014) was an Argentine-Spanish footballer and coach.

Alfredo Di Stéfano may also refer to:

 Alfredo di Stéfano Stadium, the home ground of Real Madrid Castilla
 Alfredo Di Stéfano Trophy (testimonial match), a testimonial match for Alfredo Di Stéfano in 1967
 Trofeo Alfredo Di Stéfano, a trophy awarded by Spanish sports newspaper Marca to the best footballer of La Liga